Hollis Speedway is a 0.23-mile dirt oval motor racetrack in Heflin, Alabama.

History

The track opened in 1979 and operated continuously until 1998, reopening in 2002.

The track was prominently featured in a 2020 Washington Post article following NASCAR's banning of the Confederate flag at its events, though the Hollis Speedway does not possess NASCAR sanction.

Track Champions

External links
 Official website
 2021 Track Rulebook

References

Dirt oval race tracks in the United States
Motorsport venues in the United States